Formica neoclara is a species of ant in the family Formicidae. It is a generalist that has been known to have  mutualistic relationships with 42 different species of aphids.

References

Further reading

 

neoclara
Articles created by Qbugbot
Insects described in 1893